Otto Theodore Bang Jr. (September 15, 1931 – December 29, 2008) was an American businessman and politician.

Bang was born in Madelia, Watonwan County, Minnesota. He graduated from Mayville High School in Mayville, North Dakota and received his bachelor's degree from the University of Minnesota. Bang lived in Edina, Minnesota with his wife and family and was involved in the insurance business. Bang served in the Minnesota House of Representatives from 1963 to 1973 and in the Minnesota Senate from 1973 to 1983. He was a Republican. Bang died on December 29, 2008, at the Hennepin County Medical Center in Minneapolis, Minnesota after suffering a head injury in an automobile accident in Hopkins, Minnesota on December 21, 2008.

Notes

1931 births
2008 deaths
People from Edina, Minnesota
People from Watonwan County, Minnesota
Businesspeople from Minnesota
University of Minnesota alumni
Republican Party members of the Minnesota House of Representatives
Republican Party Minnesota state senators
Road incident deaths in Minnesota